Thousands of Winters of Flames is Balflare's debut album, released in 2005.

Track listing 

Flare of Dusk - (01:00)	
Hunt and Brave - (06:22)	
Storm Mind -(04:15)	
Shadows - (01:00)	
Bind Blaze - (05:14)	
Dead Fall - (04:24)	
Four Hundred Years - (03:33)	
Thousands of Winters of Flames - (09:10)	
Sound of Silence - (05:04)

Personnel
 Hideki Tada - vocals
 Syuta Hashimoto - guitar and keyboards
 Takashi Odaira - bass
 Isao Matsuzaki - drums

References

2005 debut albums
Balflare albums